The circle of fifths text table shows the number of flats or sharps in each of the diatonic musical scales and keys. Both C major and A minor keys have no flats or sharps.

In the table, minor keys are written with lowercase letters, for brevity. However, in common guitar tabs notation, a minor key is designated with a lowercase "m". For example, A-minor is "Am" and D-sharp minor is "Dm").

The small interval between equivalent notes, such as F-sharp and G-flat, is the Pythagorean comma.

See also
 Circle of fifths
 Key signature
 Musical notation

Notes

Harmony